The Kirkby Branch Line is a branch railway line from Wigan to Kirkby.  The line's original route was from Liverpool to Bury and later the most northern of the Liverpool to Manchester lines. The line was split at Kirkby in 1977 with the western section forming a high frequency branch of the electrified Merseyrail Northern Line, also referred to as the Kirkby branch line. The Kirkby branch to Wigan remained a low frequency (one train per hour) diesel operated service by Northern Trains from Kirkby to Manchester.

History
The Liverpool and Bury Railway built the first line into Liverpool from the north. It ran from Bury via the towns of Bolton and Wigan, reaching the city of Liverpool in 1848. Soon afterwards, the Liverpool, Ormskirk and Preston Railway's route to Preston was built sharing the L&BR line as far as Walton.  Mergers meant that the Bury route was built by the Lancashire and Yorkshire Railway, which had taken over the Liverpool and Bury Railway company.  The opening ceremony took place on 20 November 1848.

With the creation of the Merseyrail metro and the closure of the route's former terminus at Liverpool Exchange in 1977 through trains to Liverpool from the Wigan direction ceased.  It had originally been intended that the line be electrified all the route from Liverpool to Wigan creating a terminal of the Merseyrail Northern Line at Wigan Wallgate. Wigan North Western is a terminal of Merseyrail's City Line.  Only the section between Liverpool and Kirkby was electrified in 1977 as a part of the Merseyrail scheme. Kirkby station was reconstructed as a terminus for Merseyrail's Northern Line Kirkby branch and the Manchester to Kirkby line. Services between Wigan and Kirkby are provided by diesel-powered trains. Passengers from the Manchester direction continuing beyond Kirkby into Liverpool change at Kirkby joining a Merseyrail-operated electric metro train. It is a long-term aspiration of Merseyrail to complete the electrification of the Northern Line to Wigan.  Merseytravel also hope to use the route as part of rail link to the town of Skelmersdale, which has been cut off from the national network since 1956 and is now one of the largest towns in North West England without a passenger rail service.

Proposals to extend Merseyrail's Northern Line to a new terminal station at Headbolt Lane, between Kirkby and Rainford, were announced in 2007 but did not receive funding.

Liverpool City Region Combined Authority announced in August 2019 that they were planning to use part of a £172m funding package into opening a new station at Headbolt Lane, subject to the plans being approved. This would relocate the Merseyrail and Northern terminal from Kirkby to Headbolt Lane station.

Route description
The former main line is now "something of a backwater", with the appearance of a rural branch line in places.

 After leaving Wigan Wallgate station, trains pass under the West Coast Main Line almost immediately, after which the Southport-bound Manchester to Southport Line diverges to the west.  
 A series of bridges take the branch line over the River Douglas and the Leeds and Liverpool Canal this includes the Adam Viaduct - the first prestressed concrete railway bridge in Britain. 
 The line reaches Pemberton station, where a now removed loop line came in on the east side.  This rejoined the line to Bolton east of Wigan, avoiding the latter town.  
 The line then passes under the M6 motorway and the  Upholland Tunnel, between which is Orrell station.  The tunnel is situated at the highest point of the line, and is the only major structural work on the route. 
 Upholland station is next, followed by Rainford—until the 1950s, a junction for two passenger lines.  One, the Skelmersdale branch, ran northwestwards towards Skelmersdale and Ormskirk; the other ran to St Helens via Crank.  The lines were both opened in 1858, although not at the same time, and were usually operated as a through route.  The Ormskirk line was built by the East Lancashire Railway, while the St Helens Railway was responsible for the line to that town.  Both survived until the 1960s for freight traffic.  
There is a rail-connected freight terminal on this section, serving the Potter Logistics depot at the Knowsley Industrial Park near Kirkby. Regular traffic from this facility resumed in July 2016, after a prolonged period of disuse (services having previously ceased in 2006).

Services
Trains start from and terminate at Manchester Victoria and join the Kirkby branch at Wigan Wallgate, having travelled via Atherton and Hindley, and change direction at Kirkby.  Services are scheduled to take between 69 and 75 minutes end-to-end. There are no weekday evening (after 20:10) or Sunday service.

As of 2010, the standard service on the Kirkby branch is hourly, with trains starting from Manchester Victoria and terminating there on the return journey.  These service frequencies have been unchanged since the 1980s however the high-level output specification for 2014-2019 envisages the service being cut back to a simple shuttle between Kirkby and Wigan Wallgate. Services are operated by Northern Trains. Network Rail has considered the effects of electrification.

Notes

References

Bibliography

Rail transport in Lancashire
Rail transport in Greater Manchester
Rail transport in Merseyside
Railway lines in North West England